Pervasive Coalition of Reformists: The Second Step, named The List of Hope by Mohammad Khatami, was the sole coalition and electoral list affiliated with the Iranian reform movement for the 2016 legislative election. The group also endorsed candidates for the 2016 Assembly of Experts election. Reformists backed a list of 236 candidates for the Parliament and 77 for the Assembly of Experts, even though many of them are not reformists but moderate-leaning figures.

The coalition includes Council for Coordinating the Reforms Front member groups, National Trust Party (close to Mehdi Karroubi), newly established Union of Islamic Iran People Party, Moderation and Development Party (close to Hassan Rouhani) and the principlist Followers of Velayat faction led by Ali Larijani.

Allied groups 
 Council for Coordinating the Reforms Front

 Moderation and Development Party
 National Trust Party
 Union of Islamic Iran People Party
 Followers of Wilayat

Endorsing non-members 
 Freedom Movement of Iran
 Council of Nationalist-Religious Activists of Iran

Electoral performance

Endorsements

Presidents

Speakers of the Parliament

Political figures

Directors, actors and actresses

References

External links 
 Official Website
 The List of Hope Website

Defunct political party alliances in Iran
Electoral lists for Assembly of Experts election, 2016
Electoral lists for Iranian legislative election, 2016
Reformist political groups in Iran